Jon Comer (January 19, 1976 – December 5, 2019) was the first professional skateboarder with a prosthetic limb (due to an amputated lower leg) and was regarded as the godfather of adaptive skateboarding.  He was featured in the award-winning documentary Never Been Done. Jon earned the respect of skateboarding legends like Tony Hawk, Steve Caballero, and Mike Vallely who admired Jon's success and determination. Comer last resided in Garland, Texas.

Comer died on 5 December 2019, aged 43. The cause of death was not revealed.

References

External links 
 
 Never Been Done: The Jon Comer Story (website)

1976 births
2019 deaths
Sportspeople from Dallas
Place of death missing
Place of birth missing
American skateboarders
Sportspeople with limb difference